Deicide is an American death metal band formed in Tampa, Florida in 1987 by drummer/composer Steve Asheim and guitarist brothers Eric and Brian Hoffman as "Carnage", then hiring bassist/vocalist/lyricist  Glen Benton and becoming "Amon". They would later change the band name to Deicide in 1989. The band rose to mainstream success in 1992 with their second album Legion, and is credited as the second-best-selling death metal band of the Soundscan Era, after Cannibal Corpse. Since their debut album in 1990, Deicide has released twelve studio albums, one live album, two compilation albums and two live DVDs. In November 2003, their first two albums, Deicide and Legion, were ranked second and third place respectively in best-selling death metal albums of the SoundScan era. Deicide is known for their lyrics, which cover topics such as Satanism, anti-Christianity and blasphemy. Their lyrics have resulted in bans, lawsuits and criticism from religious groups and the public.

History

Early days as Amon/Carnage (1987–1989)
 Deicide was formed in Tampa, Florida on July 21, 1987, after guitarist Brian Hoffman called Glen Benton, replying to an advertisement the latter had placed in a local music magazine. Hoffman and his brother, along with drummer Steve Asheim, had previously played together as the band "Carnage", which was in need of a bassist and vocalist. Carnage played cover songs by Slayer, Exodus, Celtic Frost and Dark Angel.

The new band, called Amon, consisted of Benton (bass and vocals), Hoffman, Hoffman's brother Eric (guitars) and Steve Asheim (drums). Within a month, they had recorded the Feasting the Beast 8-track demo in Benton's garage and had started playing the occasional gig in the Tampa area.  In 1989, Amon recorded their second demo, Sacrificial, at Morrisound with producer Scott Burns.

Malevolent Creation guitarist Phil Fasciana recalls an early Carnage show: "It was like Slayer intensified a thousand times." "I guess Carnage had hollowed out a mannequin and filled it with fuckin' blood and guts from a butcher shop... and then they threw the fuckin' thing on the floor. Morbid Angel had these pit bulls with them back then and they were just tearing the meat up. It was a really weird scene, man. There was blood and meat everywhere."

As Deicide (1989–2004)

Benton reportedly stormed into Roadrunner Records' A&R man Monte Conner's office and presented him with the demo, saying, "Sign us, you fucking asshole!" The next day contracts were issued to the band. In 1989 the band's name was changed to Deicide at the request of Roadrunner Records.

Deicide then released their self-titled debut album, also produced by Scott Burns at Morrisound, in 1990. Their debut featured re-recorded versions of all six of the Sacrificial tunes that had secured them their record deal.
 
Both the Hoffman brothers tended to play technical solos at fast speeds and with overlapping riffs, which gave Deicide the definitive heavy sound and complex song structures. This lineup remained intact until November 25, 2004, in the wake of increasing animosity between Glen Benton and the Hoffmans allegedly in regards to royalties and publishing. The Hoffman brothers later went on to reform Amon.

Post-Hoffman brothers period (2004–present)

Shortly after, the guitar roles were then filled by former Cannibal Corpse guitarist Jack Owen, and Vital Remains guitarist Dave Suzuki. Following the tour, Suzuki was replaced by guitarist Ralph Santolla. Santolla stated he was a Catholic, which had received a small amount of shock and ridicule from some metal fans. In spite of this, Deicide's eighth studio album The Stench of Redemption, which was released on August 22, 2006, received rave reviews.

In January 2007, Benton left the European tour and returned home to the United States as a result of legal issues at home. Asheim announced that Seth van Loo, from opening act Severe Torture, and Garbaty "Yaha", from the Polish death metal band Dissenter, would be replacing Benton starting on January 9 in the Netherlands, until Benton could rejoin the tour. Benton rejoined the band in Paris on January 13. On May 24, 2007, it was announced Ralph Santolla had left Deicide. Subsequently, he joined Florida's Obituary and appears on their album Xecutioner's Return as well as the tour. On July 20, 2007, guitarist Jack Owen announced that Deicide would be "on hiatus" and he had joined Ohio based death/thrash combo Estuary for touring purposes. The band embarked on a Balkan tour, dubbed "Balkans AssassiNation Tour", in October 2007 alongside Krisiun, Incantation and Inactive Messiah.

By November 2007, Deicide began work on their ninth studio album at Florida's Morrisound Studios. Entitled Till Death Do Us Part, the follow-up to The Stench of Redemption, promised to be the band's "most savage and aggressive [offering] to date", according to a press release. Drummer Steve Asheim recorded drum tracks and Benton started recording vocals in December 2007. In April 2008, two songs off the album were posted online. It was finally released on April 28, 2008. As the record was coming out, Benton considered retiring from music, in the midst of personal matters including a custody battle.

On January 6, 2009, Deicide posted a blog on their official Myspace page saying they had signed a worldwide record deal with Century Media, with Ralph Santolla returning to the band for a European tour. They were said to be working on material for a summer 2010 release. In early 2009, they toured with Vital Remains and Order of Ennead. Guitarist Kevin Quirion of Order of Ennead joined the band in the summer of 2009.

In June 2010, Glen Benton revealed that the next Deicide album was to be titled To Hell with God. It was produced by Mark Lewis at Audiohammer Studios in Sanford, Florida, and was released on February 15, 2011.

Deicide released their eleventh studio album, In the Minds of Evil, on November 26, 2013.

In November 2016, it was apparent that guitarist Jack Owen had been replaced by Monstrosity guitarist Mark English without an official announcement made by the band. Owen went on to join Six Feet Under in February 2017.

On October 9, 2014, The Village Voice reported that Deicide had started working on new material for their twelfth studio album. On March 10, 2017, Deicide announced a short U.S. tour which would begin in May and also issued an update on the album: "the new record is almost completed, right now its down to scheduling, this run of shows were setting up is to introduce and work in our new guitarist Mark English, that and I need a break from this thing called Florida…". The album, titled Overtures of Blasphemy, was released on September 14, 2018.

On June 6, 2018, former guitarist Ralph Santolla died due to complications following a heart attack and was taken off life support since being in a coma for a week.

In February 2019, Deicide parted ways with guitarist Mark English and replaced him with Autumn's End vocalist/guitarist Chris Cannella.

On April 17, 2021, the band performed in front of an audience of full capacity at The Verona in New Port Richey amid the COVID-19 pandemic, as all restrictions for businesses were lifted and mask mandate enforcements for local cities in Florida were removed as the state was moved into Stage 3 in late September 2020. A U.S. tour followed soon after, with Kataklysm, Internal Bleeding and Begat the Nephilim.

On January 19, 2022, it was announced guitarist Chris Cannella had left the band and was replaced by Taylor Nordberg.

Controversy

Deicide has received considerable controversy relating to their albums and lyrics, which include vehement anti-Christian themes, such as "Death to Jesus", "Fuck Your God", "Kill the Christian", "Behead the Prophet" and "Scars of the Crucifix", among others. Drummer Asheim said, "The whole point of Satanic music is to blaspheme against the Church", "I don't believe in or worship a devil. Life is short enough without having to waste it doing this whole organised praying, hoping, wishing-type thing on some superior being".

Most of the controversy surrounded frontman Benton for a rash of shocking interviews and wild statements. Benton has repeatedly branded an inverted cross into his forehead on at least 12 different occasions. During an interview with NME magazine, he shot and killed a squirrel with a pellet gun to prevent any further damage to his electrical system in the attic at the location the interview was held. This act garnered negative attention from critics and some animal rights activists. Benton had professed beliefs in theistic Satanism during Deicide's early years, claimed to slaughter rodents for fun, and that he held beliefs in demonic possession and that he was possessed. Such statements had eventually been concluded as tongue-in-cheek and little more than sensationalism by band members questioned alternatively. Additionally, Benton claimed in the early 1990s that he would commit suicide at the age of 33 to "mirror" a lifespan opposite that of Jesus Christ. However, he passed that age in 2000 and did not commit suicide, rebutting in 2006 that these statements had been "asinine remarks" and that "only cowards and losers" choose to kill themselves.

Deicide has been banned from playing in several venues (such as Valparaiso, Chile over a promotional poster featuring Jesus Christ with a bullet hole in his forehead) and with various festivals such as Hellfest, after several graves had been spray-painted with "When Satan Rules His World", a reference to a song from Deicide's 1995 album Once upon the Cross. In addition, their music video for "Homage for Satan", which features blood-splattered zombies on a rampaging mission to capture a priest, was banned from UK music TV channel Scuzz.

In 1992, Deicide was on tour in Europe with Atrocity from Germany and Gorefest, a Dutch death metal band. In Stockholm, during the Gorefest set, a bomb was discovered on-stage. It exploded in the club in which they were playing. The bomb was located to the rear of the stage, behind a heavy, fireproof door. The explosion was big enough to deform the door and blow it off its hinges. Deicide managed to play three songs before the police decided to stop the concert and evacuate the club. At first, Benton blamed that attack on the Norwegian black metal scene, where Deicide's brand of death metal was despised. Many people blamed animal rights activists who were angered at Deicide's lyrical themes of animal sacrifice.

Band members

Current members
Steve Asheim – drums , guitars 
Glen Benton – bass, lead vocals 
Kevin Quirion – guitars, backing vocals 
Taylor Nordberg – guitars, backing vocals

Former members 
Eric Hoffman – guitars 
Brian Hoffman – guitars 
Johan Stigenius – guitars, backing vocals 
Ralph Santolla – guitars 
Jack Owen – guitars 
Mark English – guitars 
Chris Cannella – guitars, backing vocals

Live members 
Dave Suzuki – guitars 
Seth Van Loo – vocals 
Dariusz "Garbaty Yaha" Kułpiński – bass, lead vocals

Recording timeline

Timeline

Discography

Deicide (1990)
Legion (1992)
Once upon the Cross (1995)
Serpents of the Light (1997)
Insineratehymn (2000)
In Torment in Hell (2001)
Scars of the Crucifix (2004)
The Stench of Redemption (2006)
Till Death Do Us Part (2008)
To Hell with God (2011)
In the Minds of Evil (2013)
Overtures of Blasphemy (2018)

References

Further reading
Mudrian, Albert (2004). Choosing Death:The Improbable History of Death Metal and Grindcore, Feral House, .

External links

 
 

Death metal musical groups from Florida
1987 establishments in Florida
Century Media Records artists
Critics of Christianity
Satanists
Earache Records artists
Musical groups established in 1987
Musical groups from Tampa, Florida
Musical quartets
Obscenity controversies in music
Roadrunner Records artists